Skinner's Bottom is a hamlet near Porthtowan in west Cornwall, England, United Kingdom.

History and antiquities
Within the St Agnes area, there were some Iron Age buildings and features were used during the Roman period from 43 to 410 AD. Northwest of Wheal Rose and west of Skinner's Bottom was building, a terraced field system, and an excavation pit. There were also some prehistoric flint arrowheads found at Skinner's Bottom slightly north and west of Spring Cottage.

Religion
Skinner's Bottom had a Wesleyan chapel and a Primitive Methodist chapel.

References

Hamlets in Cornwall